The 1974 World Team Tennis season was the inaugural season of the top professional team tennis league in the United States. The Denver Racquets defeated the Philadelphia Freedoms in the WTT Finals to win the league's first championship.

Competition format
The 1974 World Team Tennis season included 16 teams split into two divisions (Eastern and Western). The Eastern Division was further split into two sections (Atlantic and Central) which each had four teams. The Western Division was also split into two sections (Gulf Plains and Pacific) which also had four teams each. Each team played a 44-match regular-season schedule with 22 home and 22 away matches. The section champions and the two teams in each division with the best records among non section champions qualified for the division championship semifinals. The team with the best record among playoff qualifiers from the division played the team with the fourth best record in the semifinals. The teams with the second and third best records played each other in the semifinals. Teams were not given preference in seeding based on being champions of their section. The semifinal winners met the other semifinals winners from their own division to determine the division champions. The division champions met in the World Team Tennis Final.

At the start of the season, each match comprised two sets of men's singles, two sets of women's singles and two sets of mixed doubles. No men's doubles or women's doubles were played. The mixed doubles sets were played as the third and sixth sets. The coach of the home team decided whether to play men's or women's singles first and fourth or second and fifth. WTT changed the match format on May 18, 1974, to one set each of men's singles, women's singles, men's doubles, women's doubles and mixed doubles, because of concern that the matches were taking too long. The order of play was women's doubles first, men's doubles third and mixed doubles fifth. The coach of the home team decided whether men's or women's singles would be played second or fourth. Games were decided by the first player or doubles team to reach four points with no-ad scoring. Each set ended when one team had won either six or seven games and had an advantage over its opponent of at least two games. Sets that were tied 6–6 were decided by a tiebreaker. Set tiebreaker games were nine total points with the first player or doubles team to reach five the winner. An advantage of only one point was needed to win a tiebreaker game. Matches could end when one team built an insurmountable lead. For example, if a team had a 24–17 lead after four sets, the fifth set (mixed doubles) would not be played. If a team had a 22–19 lead after four sets, the match could end if the leading team won four games in the fifth set, since it would be impossible for the trailing team to make up the three-game deficit that existed when the set started. If the match was tied at the end of five sets, a super tiebreaker game was played between the mixed doubles teams using the same format as the set tiebreaker games. Teams often agreed to play dead sets even if the outcome of the match had already been decided or to play sets to completion when the outcome of the match was decided within that set.

Playoff matchups in the division semifinals and division championship series were played in two legs with each team hosting one match and the cumulative score determining the winner. The higher seed had the choice to host either the first or the second match. Should the cumulative score be tied after the conclusion of the second match, a series tiebreaker game was played to determine the series winner. The WTT Finals were a best-of-three series. The lower seed hosted the first match. The higher seed hosted the second match and the third, if necessary.

Charter franchises and relocation

On May 22, 1973, WTT announced the formation of the league with the following 16 franchises:

As shown in the above table, the Pittsburgh Triangles had a team name from the time the franchise was chartered.

On May 30, 1973, the San Diego franchise announced that it had adopted the name San Diego Swingers.

Before the WTT inaugural draft on August 3, 1973, the St. Louis franchise had relocated and was referred to as the Miami franchise at the draft.

Also before the draft, the Cincinnati franchise had been sold to Joseph Zingale and relocated to Cleveland.

Finally, by the time the inaugural draft took place, the San Francisco franchise had adopted the name the Golden Gate Otters
and was referred to as the Golden Gate franchise during the draft.

On August 21, 1973, the New York franchise announced it had adopted the name New York Sets.

By September 1973, the Los Angeles franchise had been named the Los Angeles Strings.

Before the start of the 1974 season, the Phoenix franchise was sold to Howard Fine, Gerald Klauber, Joseph Rivkin and Robert E. Bradley, Jr. who moved it to Baltimore.

Also before the start of the 1974 season, the San Diego Swingers were sold to Don Kelleher who moved them to Honolulu.

Finally, before the start of the 1974 season, the Golden Gate Otters decided to simply call the team the Golden Gaters in dealings with the public. Since it would have been absurd to call the team the Golden Gate Golden Gaters, and the league used a location to identify all its teams, WTT reverted to using San Francisco, the location for which the original charter was issued, when referring to the team. They were listed in official WTT standings as the San Francisco Golden Gaters.

The remaining charter franchises adopted names before the start of the 1974 season. The team identification and naming history of the 16 charter franchises from the founding of WTT to the start of the inaugural season is as follows:
 Boston → Boston Lobsters
 Chicago → Chicago Aces
 Cincinnati → Cleveland → Cleveland Nets
 Denver → Denver Racquets
 Detroit → Detroit Loves
 Houston → Houston E-Z Riders
 Los Angeles → Los Angeles Strings
 Minnesota → Minnesota Buckskins
 New York → New York Sets
 Philadelphia → Philadelphia Freedoms
 Phoenix → Baltimore Banners
 Pittsburgh Triangles
 St. Louis → Miami → Florida Flamingos
 San Diego → San Diego Swingers → Honolulu Swingers → Hawaii Leis
 San Francisco → Golden Gate Otters → San Francisco Golden Gaters
 Buffalo → Toronto-Buffalo Royals

Inaugural draft
WTT conducted a lottery to determine the order of selection for its inaugural draft held on August 3, 1973. The selection order determined as a result of the lottery was used for odd-numbered rounds, and it was reversed for even-numbered rounds. Each team was entitled to select 20 players. Teams that could sign players to contracts before the draft had to identify these players as preferential choices and use their earliest picks on the players signed. The players selected in the first 10 rounds of the draft are shown in the tables below.

First round

Second round

Third round

Fourth round

Fifth round

Sixth round

Seventh round

Eighth round

Ninth round

Tenth round

Notes:

Standings and attendance
Reference: 

 Detroit won a standings tiebreaker over Pittsburgh and was the Central Section Champion.

Total attendance during the season was 833,966, for an average of 2,369 over 352 playing dates.

Playoff bracket
Reference:

Playoff match results
Reference: 

 Home teams are in CAPS.

Eastern Division semifinals

Western Division semifinals

Eastern Division Championship

Western Division Championship

WTT Finals

Of the total of 14 playoff matches, home teams won only 6 and lost 8. The higher seeds had 3 wins and 4 losses in their 7 home matches. The higher seeds won 5 of the 7 series.

Individual statistical leaders
The table below shows the individual players and doubles teams who had the best winning percentages in each of the five events in WTT.

Individual honors
Reference:

See also

 1974 WTA Tour
 1974 Men's Grand Prix circuit

References

External links
 World TeamTennis official website

World Team Tennis season
World TeamTennis seasons
1974 in American tennis